Jeberos District is one of six districts of the province Alto Amazonas in Peru.

References

Districts of the Alto Amazonas Province
Districts of the Loreto Region
1857 establishments in Peru